VTK is an open-source software system for 3D computer graphics, image processing and visualization

VTK may also refer to:

VTK, the ICAO code for Vostok Aviation Company
VTK tractor models of David Brown Ltd.
VTK, the code for Vallathol Nagar railway station
VTK, a common abbreviation ("Vasgyári Testgyakorlók Köre") used for Hungarian sports clubs, such as Diósgyőri VTK
Vendhu Thanindhathu Kaadu, a 2022 Tamil film.